The Tacony Plantation is a plantation with a historic mansion in Vidalia, Louisiana, U.S.. It was built in 1850, a decade prior to the American Civil War of 1861–1865, for Alfred Vidal Davis, Sr. (1826-1899). One of his former slaves, John R. Lynch, became a politician after the war.

The plantation house, along with a  area, has been listed on the National Register of Historic Places on April 19, 1979.

See also
National Register of Historic Places listings in Concordia Parish, Louisiana

References

Houses on the National Register of Historic Places in Louisiana
Renaissance Revival architecture in Louisiana
Houses completed in 1850
Buildings and structures in Concordia Parish, Louisiana
Antebellum architecture
Plantations in Louisiana